Chanute may refer to:

Chanute, Kansas, United States
Chanute High School
Octave Chanute (1832–1910), American civil engineer and aviation pioneer
Chanute Air Force Base, Illinois, United States
Octave Chanute Award, awarded by the Western Society of Engineers since 1901
Chanute Flight Award, awarded by the American Institute of Aeronautics and Astronautics (between 1939 and 2005)
 Chanute Air Museum
Chanute (baseball team)